Endang Rahayu Sedyaningsih (1 February 1955 – 2 May 2012) was an Indonesian physician, researcher, and author. She served as Minister of Health of the Republic of Indonesia from October 22, 2009 until her passing on May 2, 2012.

Career

Sedyaningsih began her career in 1979 as a clinician in the Jakarta Pertamina Hospital. She joined the public health service in 1980 and worked in remote areas as the Head of Waipare Health Center in East Nusa Tenggara for three years. In 1983, she moved to Jakarta and continued working in the public health service with the Jakarta Provincial Health Office. In 1997, she joined the National Institute of Health Research and Development (NIHRD) of the Indonesian Ministry of Health.

Research work
Sedyaningsih worked as a researcher in the Center of Disease Control Research and Program Development, NIHRD for more than a decade. For 6 months in 2001, she spent her time working at the World Health Organization Headquarters in Geneva, Switzerland. From 1997 to 2006, Sedyaningsih held an important position at the World Health Organization’s headquarters in Geneva, as a technical adviser in the department of communicable disease surveillance and response. She was appointed as the Director of the Center of Biomedical Research and Program Development, NIHRD in 2007. Sedyaningsih was given notable credit by her fellow researchers for her courage in having helped devise the GISAID sharing mechanism, playing a constructive role in global health.

Minister of Health
22 October 2009, Sedyaningsih was appointed as the Minister of Health of the Republic of Indonesia by President Susilo Bambang Yudhoyono and joined his cabinet which is called the Second Unified Indonesia Cabinet. She succeeded her former supporter and boss Siti Fadillah Supari who had initially expressed her disappointment over the Sedyaningsih's appointment as her replacement.

Illness and death
In October 2010 she was diagnosed with lung cancer and underwent extensive treatment.  On April 20, 2012, she was admitted to Cipto Mangunkusumo Hospital (Rumah Sakit Cipto Mangunkusumo, RSCM) due to continuous pain. On April 26, 2012, when President Susilo Bambang Yudhoyono visited her in the hospital, she tendered her resignation as Minister of Health due to ill-health. On April 30, 2012, Keputusan Presiden (Presidential Decree) No. 46/P/2012 was signed by President Yudhoyono, ending Sedyaningsih's term as Indonesia's Minister of Health.

Sedyaningsih died at the age of 57 on 2 May 2012 in RSCM, Jakarta. President Susilo Bambang Yudhoyono presided over her state funeral the next day at the Heroes Plaza, San Diego Hills Memorial Park, Karawang, West Java.

Education

Sedyaningsih grew up in Jakarta and went to a public elementary school, later on called as SD Negeri Merdeka Timur. She then continued her education to SMP Negeri 35 and SMA Negeri 4 in Jalan Batu. Sedyaningsih received her medical degree in 1979 from the Faculty of Medicine at the University of Indonesia, and her Master of Public Health (MPH) and Doctor of Public Health (DrPH) degrees in Social Epidemiology from Harvard School of Public Health in 1997.

Personal life

Sedyaningsih was the oldest daughter of Sudjiran Resosudarmo and Satimah Mardjana. Sedyaningsih was married to Dr. Reanny Mamahit, an obstetrics and gynaecology specialist and Director of RSUD Tangerang (Tangerang Region Public Hospital). The couple had two sons and a daughter.

References

External links 
 Ministry of Health, Republic of Indonesia 

1955 births
Harvard School of Public Health alumni
People from Jakarta
Government ministers of Indonesia
Indonesian public health doctors
Women in Jakarta politics
University of Indonesia alumni
2012 deaths
Deaths from lung cancer
Deaths from cancer in Indonesia
Health ministers of Indonesia
Women government ministers of Indonesia
21st-century Indonesian women politicians
21st-century Indonesian politicians
Women public health doctors